Gilbert is the performance name of Matthew Gilbert Linley, a London-based composer and musician. He is also the drummer in Engineers with Mark Peters and Ulrich Schnauss.

Biography
Linley grew up in Eltham, South-east London, England.

He began playing the drums at an early age and then went on to study classical music and composition at Oriel College, Oxford University and Goldsmiths College. After a period of writing soundtracks for film and television he began writing under the Gilbert moniker.

An eponymously named debut Gilbert album completed in 2007 received excellent reviews and extensive national radio airplay, gaining a digital release soon after on the independent record label, Shifty Disco Records.

In 2010, the latest Gilbert album, Wahoola!, was released. About the new record Linley wrote: " I wanted 'Wahoola!' to more obviously feature the talents of the people who have been performing the first album live.....especially Maud Waret's vocals and Brian Lee's violin-playing". In 2013 Gilbert Linley licensed the album 'Wahoola!' to Felt Music Library.

2014 saw a new album and musical project named AztecCormorant.

In 2016, Linley collaborated with bandmate from Engineers, Mark Peters, on a new album and project entitled 'Salt Rush with Mark Peters'. This album was released by the record label Pedigree Cuts (part of Warner/Chappell Production Music)

Musical style
Linley's music is often stylistically eclectic and eccentric, crossing genres such as folktronica, electronica, classical music, dream pop and spoken word. The music is in general richly layered, combining vintage analog synths and organs with orchestral instruments such as harp, celeste and strings. Vocals by Maud Waret have also featured more prominently in recent work.

The music is performed live by five musicians playing an array of musical instruments. Gilbert has gigged extensively throughout the UK, including sets at the 2007 Green Man Festival, 2008 Brighton Loop, and 2009 Southbank Udderbelly. Gilbert also supported Mice Parade and Silje Nes in London, in October 2010.

Broadcast performances
Gilbert has been featured on BBC Radio 6 Music's BBC Introducing with Tom Robinson, BBC Radio 1 with Huw Stephens, Gary Crowley and on BBC Radio 3's Mixing It.

Gilbert tracks have also been licensed by 20th Century Fox for use on the Max Payne soundtrack DVD.

Discography

Gilbert (2007)
 Self-help for the English
 Willow
 Animal, Vegetable, Mineral
 No time to talk
 Away
 Sigh
 Head
 The bees, the breeze, the seas
 Clocks and clouds

Wahoola! (2010)
 It's all so bright
 Snow snow snow snow snow
 Wahoola!
 Red leaves floating on the water
 Where (are you)?
 Blow the trumpet
 So far away
 Let's go away

References

External links
 Gilbert myspace
 Gilbert lastFM
 Engineers' website
 Shifty Disco Records website
 Warner/Chappell - Pedigree Cuts page

English drummers
Folktronica musicians
English electronic musicians
English keyboardists
Alumni of Oriel College, Oxford
Alumni of Goldsmiths, University of London